Borca is a commune in Neamț County, Western Moldavia, Romania. It is composed of seven villages: Borca, Lunca, Mădei, Pârâul Cârjei, Pârâul Pântei, Sabasa and Soci.

Natives
Gheorghe Cartianu-Popescu (1907–1982), engineer

References

Communes in Neamț County
Localities in Western Moldavia